Sexual content has been found in video games since the early days of the industry, and games featuring sexual content can be found on most platforms and can be of any video game genre.  

The inclusion of sex in games has been subject to varying levels of controversy over the decades, sometimes resulting in calls for increased regulation and legislation dealing directly with adult content. 

In Western gaming, the promise of sexual content in games is commonly used as a marketing tool, but many highly-sexualized games do not feature any explicitly adult content. Though some games do use sex acts or nudity as a narrative device, in-game reward, or a gameplay element, purely pornographic games are uncommon.  

However, the Japanese pornographic eroge subgenre is popular worldwide. First appearing in the 1980s, these games vary significantly in narrative complexity as well as the level of interactivity, taking forms ranging from the visual novel to virtual reality experiences.

History

1980s
One of the earliest video games to feature sexual themes was the 1981 text-based Softporn Adventure, published by On-Line Systems for the Apple II. Despite heavy piracy, the game still sold 25,000 copies, roughly equivalent to 25% of the number of Apple IIs sold at the time. In a 1981 article in Time Magazine, On-Line reported that they were making a version of the game for straight women, though this never materialized.

Several pornographic games, such as X-Man, were created for the Atari 2600 in the early 1980s. The video game company, Mystique, released three unlicensed games for the Atari 2600; Beat 'Em & Eat 'Em, Custer's Revenge, and Bachelor Party.  The games were poorly received (particularly Custer's Revenge, which is considered to be one of the worst games ever made), and Mystique went out of business in 1983.  Company Playaround purchased the rights to these games and began distributing them under new titles in 2-in-1 cartridges.

In 1983, Entertainment Enterprises, Ltd. released an arcade game called Swinging Singles, which was mostly meant for bars, adult stores, and sex clubs. The game requires the player to drive through the city maze, gathering dots like Pac-Man before reaching a brothel where the player is required to fight off venereal disease and collect keys to unlock sex scenes. 

Also released in 1983 was Strip Poker: A Sizzling Game of Chance for the Commodore 64 and other 8-bit platforms, which Artworx Software created.

In 1986, Martech released a strip poker game featuring digitized pictures of Samantha Fox on the Spectrum, C64, and Amstrad. The same company would later release the controversial Vixen, featuring another page 3 model Corinne Russell.

Also, in 1986 On-line Systems (now called Sierra On-Line) asked game designer Al Lowe to create an adult game in the graphical adventure style made popular by their King's Quest series. Lowe took the basic elements of Softporn Adventure, greatly expanded it, and released it as the 1987 game Leisure Suit Larry in the Land of the Lounge Lizards. Sierra didn't advertise the game, and retailers were loath to carry it, so initial sales were low. However, word-of-mouth spread, and soon the Leisure Suit Larry series was a success, spawning two sequels before the end of the decade, 1988's Leisure Suit Larry Goes Looking for Love (in Several Wrong Places), and 1989's  Leisure Suit Larry III: Passionate Patti in Pursuit of the Pulsating Pectorals.

1990s
With CD-ROM and multimedia-based games in the 1990s, most adult games featured video clips with limited interactivity. Both pre-rendered and real-time 3D graphics were also used. While most games could be considered nothing more than pornography, some attempted to include actual stories and plots. This can be seen in some games with less explicit content, equal to an R- or PG-13-rated movie.

1990 saw the release of the first game in the Gals Panic series. The game derived gameplay elements from an older title called Qix, which didn't have sexual images. The object of the games is to slowly remove pieces of the playing field while avoiding an enemy or groups of enemies. Removing the playing field slowly reveals pictures of models in escalating states of undress. The game had nine sequels throughout the 1990s (with a final game in 2002).

Voyeur by Philips came out in 1993 for their CD-i console. While the game does not show any explicit nudity, it allows the player to spy on several characters in lingerie, and foreplay and explores taboos such as BDSM and incest.

In the 1990s NEC (on the PC Engine series and PC-FX) and Sega (on Saturn) were the only companies who officially allowed sexual content on their consoles in Japan, but eroge was more prevalent on the NEC PC-98 and FM Towns computer platforms.

2000s

Modern console publishers often have policies against depictions of nudity and explicit sexuality, particularly Sony Computer Entertainment with its PlayStation brand of consoles. BMX XXX for the PlayStation 2 was censored in the American release, while versions on the Xbox and Nintendo GameCube were not and featured nudity. However, Sony allowed nudity in the title God of War (2005), and also developed by Sony, a game based on Greek mythology set in Ancient Greece, where nudity was perceived differently. Nudity was subsequently featured in the game's sequels, God of War II (2007), God of War: Chains of Olympus (2008), God of War III (2010), God of War: Ghost of Sparta (2010), and God of War: Ascension (2013), which were also based on Greek mythology. The full -motion video quiz game The Guy Game (2004) gained notoriety for its use of an underage model. The scenes in question led to a lawsuit by a woman who explained that she was only seventeen years old when the footage was taken, thus classifying it as child pornography which is illegal to own or sell in some countries.

Sex scenes and nudity have also appeared in Quantic Dream's Fahrenheit (aka Indigo Prophecy) and Heavy Rain, released for the PlayStation 2 and PlayStation 3 respectively.

Sexuality and sexual frustration is also a theme prevalent in the Silent Hill series of survival-horror games.

A new generation of adult social games has emerged that bring multiple users together in sexual environments. Examples include Red Light Center, Singles: Flirt Up Your Life and Playboy: The Mansion. While it is not explicitly intended for purely adult-oriented entertainment, the virtual world of Second Life, which is made up almost entirely of player-made content, has an array of very exotic adult entertainment including nudity and full-on sexual activities.

Adult games may take the form of bootlegs, circumventing mainstream publishers who may have policies against such games. Patches or hacks to mainstream non-adult games may add sexual and pornographic themes, mostly for humor, especially when sexuality was never intended in the original game. Examples include the Tomb Raider video games, the Grand Theft Auto: San Andreas Hot Coffee mod, The Elder Scrolls IV: Oblivion and The Elder Scrolls V: Skyrim, (which both have multiple such mods), Half-Life 2'''s FakeFactory Cinematic Mod and ROM hacks for console emulators.

The Internet has allowed adult games to receive wider availability and recognition, including amateur games in Flash or Java. It has also allowed amateurs to create and distribute adult text adventure games, known as "Adult Interactive Fiction" or AIF.

Modern consumer virtual reality headsets, such as the Oculus Rift and HTC Vive, allow users to engage in virtual sex through simulated environments. An example is VR Kanojo.

2010s
Blizzard Entertainment's 2016 game Overwatch has inspired a notable amount of fan-made porn. Short porn videos featuring official characters have been animated via Source Filmmaker and are popular on porn sites such as Pornhub and YouPorn. Despite its popularity, Blizzard has issued cease-and-desist orders to some of the creators.

Indie games have expanded the reach of adult games, and Steam now allows adult games onto its storefront. Patreon provides direct funding to adult developers, allowing games like Hardcoded to appeal to niche markets that previously would not have been created.

The continuing rise of open-source software development practices has also influenced adult video games, allowing communities of amateurs to collaboratively create and distribute adult games via the Internet.

Eroge

In 1982, Japan's Koei, founded by husband-and-wife team Yoichi and Keiko Erikawa (and later known for strategy video games), released the first erotic computer game with sexually explicit graphics, Night Life, an early graphic adventure game for the NEC PC-8801. That same year, Koei released another erotic title, Danchi Tsuma no Yuwaku (Seduction of the Condominium Wife), which was an early role-playing adventure game with colour graphics, owing to the eight-color palette of the NEC PC-8001 computer. It became a hit, helping Koei become a major software company.

In another opinion, Yuji Horii recalled in 1986 that he saw a demonstration of a Yakyūken-like game running on the FM-8 in the end of 1981, and he considered Yakyūken was the origin of adult games. Some writers say that Yakyūken (1981) produced for Sharp MZ computers by Hudson Soft is the first Japanese adult game.

Like with Koei, several other now-famous Japanese companies such as Enix, Square and Nihon Falcom also released erotic adult games for the PC-8801 computer in the early 1980s before they became mainstream. Early eroge usually had simplistic stories and extreme sexual content, such as rape and lolicon. In some of the early erotic games, the erotic content is meaningfully integrated into a thoughtful and mature storyline, though others often used it as simply an excuse for pornography.

In 1999, Key released Kanon. It contains about 7 brief erotic scenes in a sentimental story the size of a long novel (an all-ages version was also released afterward). Kanon sold over 300,000 copies.

In response to increasing pressure from Japanese lobby groups, in mid-1996 Sega of Japan announced that they would no longer permit Sega Saturn games to include nudity.

Many fanservice video games with sexual content have some brief nudity. The "M" rated series Senran Kagura has some nudity in both gameplay and cutscenes but genitals aren't displayed. Fanservice games rated "T" such as Hyperdimension Neptunia offer similar content but less than what Senran Kagura has. However, since 2018, Sony has now issued new regulations for PlayStation 4 games with both fanservice and sexual content. For the localized release of Senran Kagura Burst Re:Newal, "Intimacy Mode", a mode where the player can play with the characters' bodies was removed, but by comparison, this mode is still available in the series' previous titles Senran Kagura: Estival Versus and Senran Kagura: Peach Beach Splash. The PC release of Burst Re:Newal was not changed. Many other recent PS4 games with sexual content are facing the same problem from Sony, including Neptunia, Date a Live: Rio Reincarnation, Death end re;Quest and the Nekopara series, although Sony did allow nudity and a sex scene in The Last of Us Part II. This controversy had become a problem for the development of Senran Kagura 7even'', in which publishers Marvelous are now reconsidering the game and series producer Kenichiro Takaki is now leaving Marvelous.

Lists of related games
List of erotic video games
List of regionally censored video games
List of Japanese erotic video games
List of AO-rated video games (the ESRB's "Adults Only" rating)
List of controversial video games
List of banned video games

See also
Breast physics
Overwatch and pornography
Cybersex
Eroge
Hentai
Virtual sex
Uncanny valley
Criticism of Second Life
Gender representation in video games
BDSM in culture and media
Sexism in video gaming

References

 Video games
Video game types

Sex industry